Fort Mill Downtown Historic District is a national historic district located at Fort Mill, York County, South Carolina. It encompasses 16 contributing buildings, 1 contributing site, 1 contributing structure, and 4 contributing objects in the central business district of Fort Mill. The buildings are predominantly one and two-story masonry commercial buildings constructed between 1860 and 1940.  The district includes the Confederate Park and its Bandstand.  Notable contributing resources include the Confederate Soldiers Monument, Catawba Indians Monument, Faithful Slaves Monument, Jones Drug Store, and First National Bank / Old City Hall.

It was added to the National Register of Historic Places in 1992.

References

Historic districts on the National Register of Historic Places in South Carolina
Commercial buildings on the National Register of Historic Places in South Carolina
Buildings and structures in York County, South Carolina
National Register of Historic Places in York County, South Carolina